A John Prine Christmas is the 11th studio album by American folk singer John Prine, released in 1993.

"If You Were the Woman and I Was the Man" is a duet with Margo Timmins, lead singer of the Cowboy Junkies.

Reception

Writing for Allmusic, critic Ronnie D. Lankford Jr. wrote of the album "this isn't the run-of-the-mill holiday product, and Prine can still write a good song when he sets his mind to it. Old fans will be glad to see that even cynics can age gracefully." Music critic Robert Christgau gave the album a 1-star Honorable Mention rating.

Track listing
"Everything Is Cool" (John Prine) – 3:24
"All the Best" (Prine) – 4:34 (live)
"Silent Night All Day Long	" – 3:52
"If You Were the Woman and I Was the Man" (Michael Timmins) – 4:36 (live)
"Silver Bells" (Ray Evans, Jay Livingston) – 3:57
"I Saw Mommy Kissing Santa Claus" (Tommie Connor) – 3:06
"Christmas in Prison" (Prine) – 3:59 (live)
"A John Prine Christmas" (Prine) – 5:10

References

John Prine albums
1993 Christmas albums
Christmas albums by American artists
Oh Boy Records albums
Folk Christmas albums
Country Christmas albums